Athyma larymna, the great sergeant, is a species of nymphalid butterfly found in tropical and subtropical Asia.

References

Cited references

Athyma
Fauna of Pakistan
Butterflies of Asia
Butterflies of Indochina
Butterflies described in 1848